Raorchestes kadalarensis is a species of frog of the genus Raorchestes found in Kadalar near Munnar in the Western Ghats of Kerala in India.

References

External links
 

kadalarensis
Frogs of India
Endemic fauna of the Western Ghats
Munnar
Amphibians described in 2011